Sexy Sweet Thing is a 2000 album released by the funk group Cameo. This 13-track release was Cameo's first full album of new material since In the Face of Funk in 1994, and peaked June 24, 2000, at #64 on the Top R&B/Hip-Hop Albums charts. To date, this has been the last album released by Cameo; Sexy Sweet Thing was followed up by the single "El Passo" in 2019 but did not chart making this record their latest to enter any chart.

Track listing

External links

References 

Sexy Sweet Thing
Sexy Sweet Thing